The Dewan Bahasa dan Pustaka Library is a group of public libraries operated by Dewan Bahasa dan Pustaka Brunei. It is also the legal deposit and copyright for Brunei.

History

The first Dewan Bahasa dan Pustaka Library was established in 1963 and it was temporarily housed in the then Department of Education. A new building was then constructed on Jalan Elizabeth II in Bandar Seri Begawan, which would become the headquarters for Dewan Bahasa dan Pustaka Brunei. The building began to be used in 1967 on 29 September the following year it was officially opened by His Royal Highness Pengiran Muda Haji Mohammed Alam.

From the time of the establishment, the library materials were only available for reference. However, from 1 September 1971, the library was made a public library and lending services are now offered to the public.

From 1992 to 1994, the administration section of Dewan Bahasa dan Pustaka Brunei gradually moved to the new building in the Old Airport area, and has since become the current headquarters location. Meanwhile, from 1994 the building at Jalan Elizabeth II has been made solely as a public library.

Throughout the decades following the time of its establishment, a number of public libraries were also created outside of the capital as well as in other districts. The first public library services in the all three other districts (Belait, Tutong and Temburong) were established in 1975. The latest public library was opened in Lambak Kanan in 2008.

Public libraries 
At present, there are nine public libraries under the management of Dewan Bahasa dan Pustaka Brunei, which consist of the following:
 Bandar Seri Begawan Library – It is the main branch, and acts as the national library for Brunei.
 Sengkurong Library
 Lambak Kanan Library
 Muara Library
 Tutong District Library
 Kuala Belait Library
 Kampong Pandan Library
 Seria Library
 Temburong District Library

Services 
Apart from the usual library services in the public libraries, which include provision of reading materials and other media, lending and references, the Dewan Bahasa dan Pustaka Library also provides Perkhidmatan Perpustakaan Bergerak or the Mobile Library Services. These are essentially mini libraries on buses and on certain days of the year they travel to various schools nationwide to provide additional library services to the respective schools. The Library also helps to establish Reading Corners in longhouses in the interior part of the country.

See also 
 List of libraries in Brunei

References

External links
 Dewan Bahasa dan Pustaka Library website  
 Dewan Bahasa dan Pustaka Brunei Library on Brunei Darussalam Libraries website  

 
Bruneian culture
Brunei
Libraries established in 1968
Libraries in Brunei